Ilex jamaicana is a plant species in the family Aquifoliaceae. It is endemic to Jamaica.  It is threatened by habitat loss.

References

jamaicana
Endemic flora of Jamaica
Endangered plants
Taxonomy articles created by Polbot